The Red Sea Port Authority is responsible for the operation of several ports located along the coast of the Red Sea.

Sea ports 
The ports include:
Suez Port
Petroleum Dock Port
Adabieh Port
Sokhna Port
Hurghada Port
Safaga Port
Noueibah Port
Al-Tour Port
Sharm El-Sheikh Port

See also 
Red Sea
Suez
Transportation in Egypt

Official web site  
Red Sea Ports Authority (Arabic)

Ports and harbours of Egypt
Government agencies of Egypt
Water transport in Egypt
Red Sea Governorate
Red Sea
Port authorities